The Typhoon Senior is an American trailerable sailboat that was designed by Carl Alberg as a cruiser and first built in 1984.

The boat is a development of the Cape Dory 22, using the same hull mold, but a new deck and rig.

Production
The design was built by Cape Dory Yachts in the United States, with 57 boats completed between 1984 and 1987, but it is now out of production.

Design
The Typhoon Senior is a recreational keelboat, built predominantly of fiberglass, with wood trim. It has a fractional sloop rig; a spooned, raked stem; a raised counter, angled transom; a keel-mounted rudder controlled by a tiller and a fixed long keel. It displaces  and carries  of ballast.

The boat is normally fitted with a small,  outboard motor for docking and maneuvering. The outboard motor is mounted in a transom well, with a hatch cover.

The design has sleeping accommodation for four people, with a double "V"-berth in the bow cabin, and two straight settees in the main cabin. There is an ice box underneath the companionway ladder. The head is located under the bow cabin berth.

Operational history
The boat is supported by an active class club that organizes racing events, the Cape Dory Sailboat Owners Association.

In a 2010 review Steve Henkel wrote, "Best features: She's got that Alberg look, with springy sheer and gracefully drawn ends. And though this boat is close in most dimensions to her comp[etitor]s, she has the feel of a bigger boat, with more space and greater headroom below than her comp[etitor]s. Worst features: Why the quaint little portholes instead of oval or rectangular portlights? Others must have asked the
same question; rectangular ports were substituted on a later version. The outboard well amidships, covered with a full hatch, may look good, but we recall that ventilation in the engine compartment was poor, and to keep the engine from starving from lack of fresh air, the crew would have to prop open the hatch."

See also
List of sailing boat types

Related development
Cape Dory 22

References

External links
Video - sailing a Typhoon Senior

Keelboats
1980s sailboat type designs
Sailing yachts
Trailer sailers
Sailboat type designs by Carl Alberg
Sailboat types built by Cape Dory Yachts